Frank Castle / The Punisher, a vigilante antihero created by Marvel Comics, has appeared in various mediums of media. Since the character's creation in 1974, he has appeared in films, television, and video games. The character, and his symbol have featured on products and merchandise.

Television

Animation
 Punisher appears in Spider-Man: The Animated Series, voiced by John Beck. He first appears in the seventh and eighth episodes of the second season, and later appears in the eighth episode of season four. Due to the requirements for children's programming, The Punisher was restricted to using non-lethal weapons which took the form of concussion blast energy weapons or gimmick guns such as electrified net launchers. The death of his family was portrayed off-screen by showing a kite flying and then falling, at the sound of gunshots.
 In the X-Men episode "Days of Future Past (Part 1)", two children are seen holding a video game cartridge called Assassin, with the Punisher on the cover of the video game. The game was produced by "Marbles", a play on "Marvel". A robot duplicate of the Punisher also appeared in the episode entitled "Mojovision", attacking Wolverine and Jean Grey.
 In Iron Man: Armored Adventures, the Punisher is mentioned as a vigilante henchman. In the episode "Armor Wars", Pepper Potts suggests Tony taking revenge on Obadiah Stane "Punisher-style". In the episode "The Hammer Falls," the Punisher is mentioned by Pepper as a possible culprit for the one attacking Iron Man's rogue's gallery when it was actually Justin Hammer in the Titanium Man armor looking for the mysterious person who was blackmailing him.
 The Punisher appears in The Super Hero Squad Show episode "Night in the Sanctorum", voiced by Ray Stevenson. He was restricted to non-lethal weaponry like lasers. When Enchantress used her magic to crash the Super Hero Squad's Helicarrier into the wall separating Super Hero City and Villainville, Punisher's van was one of the possible places for them to crash for a while.
 In The Avengers: Earth's Mightiest Heroes episode "Enter the Whirlwind", the Punisher is mentioned by a taxi driver who is reading a newspaper article that states "Vigilante 'Punishes' Again" and a photograph of the Punisher's skull logo.
 The Punisher makes a cameo appearance in the Avengers Assemble episode "Planet Doom", voiced by an uncredited Travis Willingham. He is a hero operating undercover within Doctor Doom's empire in an alternate timeline.
 In the fourth episode of Hit-Monkey, a character is shown reading a Punisher manga.

Live-action

Frank Castle appears in TV series set in the Marvel Cinematic Universe, portrayed by Jon Bernthal:
 Frank appears in the second season of Daredevil. Daredevil crosses paths with him when he has targeted some gangs in Hell's Kitchen. During the final episode, he assists Daredevil by sniping the Hand ninjas.
 Frank appears in The Punisher. In the first season, Punisher uncovers a larger conspiracy beyond what was done to him and his family. This leads to him allying with Micro. In the second season, Punisher is drawn into the mystery surrounding the attempted murder of Amy Bendix when she's targeted by John Pilgrim under the orders of Anderson and Eliza Schultz. At the same time, his former best friend Billy is slowly turned into the psychotic Jigsaw.
 It was announced that Bernthal will be reprising his role as Castle in Daredevil: Born Again.

Films

Live-action
 The Punisher appears in The Punisher, portrayed by Dolph Lundgren.
 The Punisher appears in The Punisher, portrayed by Thomas Jane.
 The Punisher appears in Punisher: War Zone, portrayed by Ray Stevenson.

Animation
 The Punisher appears in Iron Man: Rise of Technovore, voiced by Norman Reedus.
 The Punisher appears in Avengers Confidential: Black Widow & Punisher, voiced by Brian Bloom.

Video games

 The Punisher appears in The Punisher.
 The Punisher appears in The Punisher.
 The Punisher appears in The Punisher: The Ultimate Payback!.
 The Punisher appears in The Punisher.
 The Punisher appears in Spider-Man, voiced by Daran Norris. Spider-Man encounters him near the docks and prevents Punisher from sniping him. By the end of the game Punisher plays cards with Spider-Man, Daredevil, and Captain America.
 The Punisher appears in The Punisher, voiced by Thomas Jane.
 The Punisher is mentioned in Marvel Nemesis: Rise of the Imperfects.
 The Punisher appears in The Punisher: No Mercy.
 The Punisher is mentioned in Marvel Ultimate Alliance 2.
 The Punisher's costume is available as part of the DLC "Marvel Costume Kit 4" of LittleBigPlanet.
 The Punisher's Captain America costume appears as an alternate costume for Captain America in Marvel vs. Capcom 3.
 A zombified version of The Punisher makes a cameo in Frank West's ending in Ultimate Marvel vs. Capcom 3.
 The Punisher appeared as an unlockable playable character for a limited time in Marvel Super Hero Squad Online, voiced by Crispin Freeman.
 The Punisher appeared as an unlockable playable character in Marvel Avengers Alliance.
 The Punisher appeared as an unlockable playable character in Marvel Heroes, voiced by Marc Worden.
 The Punisher appears as an unlockable playable character in Lego Marvel Super Heroes, voiced by Robin Atkin Downes.
 The Punisher appeared in Marvel Avengers Academy, voiced by James Arnold Taylor. He was first featured as an antagonist, fighting with Kingpin. He could later be recruited after his defeat during the "Daredevil" event. 
 The Punisher appears as an unlockable playable character in Marvel Puzzle Quest.
 The Punisher appears as an unlockable playable character in Marvel Contest of Champions.
 The Punisher appears as an unlockable playable character in Marvel Future Fight.
 The Punisher appears as a playable character in Marvel Ultimate Alliance 3: The Black Order, voiced again by Brian Bloom. He is available via the "Marvel Knights: Curse of the Vampire" DLC.
 The Punisher appears as a playable character in Marvel Strike Force. He is a City Blaster allied with the Military team, though he shares synergies with Daredevil. His default costume is a modernized version of his classic look.

Web series
 The Punisher appears in Marvel Superheroes: What the--?!.

Comic strips
The Punisher appeared in The Amazing Spider-Man comic strip in 2004.

Novels
 In 2004 the Punisher film from that year was novelized.
 The Punisher appears in the prose novel adaptation of the event comic Civil War.

Tabletop games
 Punisher has been featured in Heroclix Collectible Miniatures Game.
 Punisher has been announced for Marvel Crisis Protocol Miniatures Game.

References

External links
 
 The Punisher at Marvel.com